Johnathan McCormick "Johnny" Mortimer (5 December 1923 – July 2013) was an English professional footballer who played as a defender. He made appearances in the English football league with Wrexham and New Brighton.

References

1923 births
2013 deaths
Wrexham A.F.C. players
New Brighton A.F.C. players
Ellesmere Port Town F.C. players
English footballers
Association football defenders